Liberty Ranch High School''' is a 9-12th grade high school in Galt, California and a part of the Galt Joint Union High School District. It was opened in 2009 to only Freshman and Sophomores. The first graduating class was in 2012.

It serves a portion of Galt, as well as Clay, Herald, and a small section of Wilton. It also serves residents of the New Hope School District.

References

External links
 Liberty Ranch High School

Public high schools in California
High schools in Sacramento County, California
2009 establishments in California